The 2009–10 Eastern Counties Football League season was the 68th in the history of Eastern Counties Football League a football competition in England.

Premier Division

The Premier Division featured 19 clubs which competed in the division last season, along with three new clubs, promoted from Division One:
Debenham LC
Hadleigh United
Newmarket Town

League table

Division One

Division One featured 17 clubs which competed in the division last season, along with two new clubs:
Team Bury, joined from the Essex and Suffolk Border League
Whitton United, relegated from the Premier Division

League table

References

External links
 Eastern Counties Football League

2009-10
9